Marieke Keijser (born 21 January 1997) is a Dutch representative rower. She is an Olympian and won the silver medal in the lightweight single sculls at the 2017 World Rowing Championships and the gold medal at the 2018 European Rowing Championships. She is racing the Dutch lightweight women's double scull with Ilse Paulis at Tokyo 2021.

Junior career
When she was young she was a ballerina and was accepted for a year at the Royal Dutch Conservatorium. She played field hockey for a while. She started rowing at aged 11, following after her brother. By age 19, Keijser had competed at three World Rowing Junior Championships. In the women’s single scull she won a bronze medal in 2014 and then a gold medal a Junior World Championship title in 2015.

References

External links
 

1997 births
Living people
Dutch female rowers
World Rowing Championships medalists for the Netherlands
Rowers at the 2020 Summer Olympics
Medalists at the 2020 Summer Olympics
Olympic medalists in rowing
Olympic bronze medalists for the Netherlands
21st-century Dutch women